Gauge (  or  ) may refer to:

Measurement 
 Gauge (instrument), any of a variety of measuring instruments
 Gauge (firearms)
 Wire gauge, a measure of the size of a wire
 American wire gauge, a common measure of nonferrous wire diameter, especially electrical
 Birmingham gauge, a measure of ferrous wire and hypodermic needle diameter
 Jewelry wire gauge, the size of wire used in jewelry making
 Sheet metal gauge, thickness of metal in sheet form
 Film gauge, a physical property of film stock which defines its size
 The size of objects used in stretching (body piercing), especially earrings
 Gauge block, a metal or ceramic block of precisely known dimension, used in measuring
 Sight glass, also known as a water gauge, for measuring liquid level heights in storage tanks and pressure vessels
 Boost gauge, a gauge used in conjunction with turbo-super-chargers
 Pressure gauge or vacuum gauge, see pressure measurement
 Gauge pressure, pressure above ambient pressure
 Stream gauge, for measuring height and discharge of a river or stream
 Air core gauge, a type of rotary actuator often used in automotive instruments
 Gauger, one who gauges or measures, typically dutiable commodities, such as wine, landed from ships at docks

Sizes

Railway practice 
 Track gauge, the distance between the two rails forming a railway track
 Loading gauge, the maximum width and height of vehicles (engines, loaded wagons, etc.).
 Structure gauge, the minimum size of bridges, tunnels, platforms, etc.
 Axle load, the weight that an axle exerts on track
 Variable gauge, system to allow railway vehicles to travel across a break of gauge

Medicine
 Birmingham gauge, for metal wire and tube products
 French gauge, mainly for catheters

Mathematics and physics 
 Gauge theory
 Gauge integral
 Gauge fixing
 Gauge boson
 Gauge (Minkowski functional)

Other uses 
 Gauge (knitting), the number of stitches in a given length
 Gauge (actress), American pornographic actress
 Gauge (band), post-hardcore band from Chicago, Illinois, USA
 Gauge, Inc., a manufacturer of microphones and audio accessories
 Change of gauge (aviation), when an aircraft type changes at a stopping point of a direct flight
 Gauge (software), cross-platform test automation tool

See also 
 Gage (disambiguation)
 Gaige (disambiguation)